Joseph Cooksey Jackson KC (12 January 1879 – 26 April 1938) was a British barrister and Conservative politician. He was the Member of Parliament for Heywood and Radcliffe from 1931 to 1935.

He was educated at the Royal Grammar School, Lancaster and Clare College, Cambridge, where he graduated B.A. in 1900. He was admitted to the Middle Temple in 1908, and was called to the bar in 1909.

He defended the boxer Jackie Brown on an assault charge in 1934, with Edgar Lustgarten as his junior.

References

External links 
 

1879 births
1938 deaths
Members of the Middle Temple
20th-century King's Counsel
Conservative Party (UK) MPs for English constituencies
UK MPs 1931–1935
Alumni of Clare College, Cambridge
People educated at Lancaster Royal Grammar School